The Chongqing World Trade Center (WTCC) is a -tall skyscraper located in the Jiefangbei CBD area of Chongqing, China.

The building was completed in 2005 after three years of construction beginning in 2002 and topping out in 2004. The building has 60 floors which can all be accessed by 12 elevators. There are also two underground floors used as car park. CRT Metro Line 2 has an exit at Linjiangmen Station in the World Trade Center's retail podium.

The Chongqing World Trade Center is currently the 54th tallest existing skyscraper in the world when measured up to the spire and is the fourth tallest building in Western China (since being recently eclipsed by several other towers also in Chongqing).

See also
 List of skyscrapers
 List of tallest buildings in Chongqing

References

External links
 SkyscraperPage.com entry
 Emporis.com – Building ID 205276

2005 establishments in China
Buildings and structures completed in 2005
Skyscraper office buildings in Chongqing
World Trade Centers
Skyscraper hotels in Chongqing
Skyscrapers in Chongqing